This is a round-up of the 1992 Sligo Intermediate Football Championship. Drumcliffe/Rosses Point went one step better than in 1991 by winning the title, to continue the club's remarkable success rate of the late 1980s/early 1990s. Mullinabreena were the beaten finalists on this occasion.

First round

Quarter finals

Semi-finals

Sligo Intermediate Football Championship Final

Sligo Intermediate Football Championship
Sligo Intermediate Football Championship